Huang Wei (born 1959) is a Chinese real estate developer and billionaire.

Biography
Huang Wei was born in 1959. He attended Wenzhou Normal College.

Huang Wei founded Xinhu Zhongbao, a real estate company based in Hangzhou.

He is married and lives in Hangzhou, China.

References 

1959 births
Living people
Chinese real estate businesspeople
Billionaires from Zhejiang
Businesspeople from Zhejiang